Natalie C. Ziegler (born September 5, 1955) is an American politician and farmer. She is a member of the Maryland House of Delegates for District 9A in Howard and Montgomery counties.

Background
Born in 1955, Ziegler was raised in New York City and Boston. She graduated from Abbot Academy in 1972 and Oberlin College in 1977, receiving a bachelor's degree with high honors in psychology, and later attended the Johns Hopkins University School of Advanced International Studies, where she earned a master's degree in economics and American foreign policy in 1986. She worked as a journalist and a guest booker for CNN, but quit her job after the death of her grandfather in 1989.

Ziegler is a descendant of Charles Carroll of Carrollton, a former U.S. Senator from Maryland and a signer of the Declaration of Independence. She is the owner of Carroll's Doughoregan Manor plantation house and estate in Howard County, and co-manages the 1,150-acre South Manor farm (originally part of Carroll's estate) with Ricky Bauer, a local farmer. She also owns Carroll Mill Farms in Ellicott City, Maryland.

In 2018, Ziegler ran for the Maryland House of Delegates in District 9A, challenging incumbent Republican state delegates Trent Kittleman and Warren E. Miller. She won the Democratic primary on June 26, 2018, but was defeated by Kittleman and Miller in the general election on November 6. Shortly after her loss, county executive-elect Calvin Ball III named Ziegler to serve on the county's public works subcommittee transition team.

In January 2020, Ziegler was appointed to the Howard Community College Board of Trustees. She was reappointed to the board in October 2021.

In November 2021, Ziegler filed to run for state delegate in District 9A, seeking to succeed outgoing state delegate Reid Novotny, who ran unsuccessfully for Maryland Senate. She won a tight general election on November 8, 2022, coming in first.

In the legislature
Ziegler was sworn into the Maryland House of Delegates on January 11, 2023. She is a member of the House Environment and Transportation Committee.

Personal life
Ziegler lives in Ellicott City with her husband, John Zirschky. Together, they have two children.

Political positions
In September 2016, Ziegler supported and testified for a proposal to expand solar development on Howard County farmland.

Electoral history

References

External links
 

1955 births
21st-century American politicians
21st-century American women politicians
Abbot Academy alumni
CNN people
Democratic Party members of the Maryland House of Delegates
Farmers from Maryland
Living people
Oberlin College alumni
Paul H. Nitze School of Advanced International Studies alumni
Women state legislators in Maryland
People from Ellicott City, Maryland
Carroll family
Businesspeople from Maryland